Charlotte Webster (born 9 November 1982) is an English television presenter and campaigner.

Early life and education
Webster was born in Sheffield and attended Tapton School where she participated in elite junior athletics. She has lived in Crookes, Newcastle Upon Tyne, and Leeds.

She studied Language and Linguistics at Newcastle University. At university, she worked as a personal trainer, fitness instructor and model.

Career

Broadcasting
Webster moved to Spain as a TV presenter for Real Madrid TV interviewing the Galactico team and presenting football programmes. In 2006, she moved to Asia to join ESPN where she presented live Premier League football in addition to motorsport and Asian football.

Upon moving back to the UK, Webster presented Setanta Sports News and ITV4's live GP2 coverage. At the end of the motorsport season, she became a sports broadcast journalist for BBC Look East. Next she moved on to present the Red Bull Air Race worldwide for ITV4. In addition, she was the voice of a World Superbikes highlights show on Channel 4. From 2009 to 2014, she was a presenter/reporter on Sky Sports' live coverage of Elite League and also of Speedway Grand Prix.

In November 2010, Webster became a regular presenter on Sky Sports News until March 2014. Also in 2010 she presented the Goodwood Festival of Speed live on Sky Sports, she featured on BBC One's Football Focus, and presented the UK School Games for Channel 4 with Iwan Thomas.

Webster appears on Channel 4 presenting triathlon and endurance events, sports in which she also competes on occasion. Webster presented the Sky Sports boxing Prizefighter series for 2012/2013. Webster also presented the women's boxing at the London 2012 Olympic Games, as well as the beach volleyball and the athletics for the Paralympics 2012. She also presented Wimbledon report in 2012 for Sky Sports.

On 26 April 2014, Webster made TV history by becoming the first female presenter of boxing coverage as Wladimir Klitschko defended his heavyweight belts against Alex Leapai shown live on British Eurosport 2. She has since presented six World Title fights including Terry Flanagan's title defence and Liam Smith's world title win on BoxNation. Webster has her own boxing themed chat show, Charlie's Web, on BoxNation.

Webster has made guest appearances on Good Morning Britain, discussing breaking sports and social topics including the sacking of Jose Mourinho in 2015. Also in 2015, Webster presented the World's Strongest Man for Channel 5 which was broadcast in the UK on six consecutive evenings over that year's Christmas period.

Webster presented the 2016 Tour Series Cycling for ITV4  the BDO World Darts Trophy for the Dave channel. She hosted the Wings For Life World Run for Red Bull TV as well as the Red Bull Air Race 2016. In October 2017 she co-anchored the pre show for the Best FIFA Football Awards 2017. She anchored the Ironman World Championships live in 2017 in Kona, Hawaii.

She has made guest appearances on BBC 5Live on Question Time Extra and Chiles on Friday.

Writing
Webster has written numerous sports columns, including a weekly football feature in the New Paper. She writes a blog on SkySports.com, and also writes for the Huffington Post, the Sheffield Star and football.co.uk. She writes a football column for Football Punk magazine and guest writes for The Independent and The Telegraph.

Other activities
After her studies at university, Webster began modelling professionally and also worked as a magician's assistant. She hosted various Nike training club events for Nike Women to help inspire women and girls to take up sport and exercise.

In 2004, Webster posed in lingerie for FHM magazine.

She was a contestant on the Channel 4 reality TV show Fool Around With.

Webster has hosted the RCM obesity seminar, spoke at the Women's Aid 'real man' campaign dinner and at the London Football Coaches Association dinner.

In November 2014, Webster resigned as a patron of Sheffield United after Ched Evans was invited to train at the club.

Personal life

Sports
Webster is a keen runner, triathlete, and boxer, training at the Lynn ABC, and has completed her level 2 Football Association coaching badge. She is a lifelong fan of Sheffield United.

She has run at least ten marathons, including the London, New York, Singapore and Houston Marathons. Her first attempt at a triathlon was at the London Triathlon where she not only competed but also presented at the same time (for Channel 4). In July 2015, she completed her first Ironman Triathlon in 15 hours, 8 minutes and 59 seconds. She completed the Staffordshire 70.3 Ironman five weeks before in June 2015 as preparation in 6 hours 20 minutes.

Charity work
In April 2009, Webster ran in the London Marathon raising money for the Bobby Moore Fund for Cancer Research UK. In April 2010, she ran the London Marathon again, raising money for the Women's Aid Federation of England.

An ambassador for Women's Aid, on 15 January 2014 in interview with BBC Radio 5 Live's Phil Williams, she revealed that aged 15 she had been groomed and sexually abused by her running coach, choosing to waive her right to anonymity to go public with the revelations to "break the taboo about abuse as a whole". Webster stated:
 The man was later sentenced to 10 years in jail and put on the sex offender registry, after another younger girl recorded the abuse and contacted police. Webster has appeared on BBC's This Week discussing domestic abuse.

In March 2010, she competed in the Macmillan 4x4 UK Challenge event in aid of Macmillan Cancer Support. She took an active role in the event, quickly learning the art of navigation and 4x4 driving, the event itself took place in the Mid to North Wales forests. The event raised £123,000 for Macmillan Cancer Support.

Webster was presented with a heroes award in Parliament for her work in increasing awareness of domestic abuse and raising funds for Women's Aid. She is part of the Ministry of Justice's victim's panel to advise ministers directly on how to improve the criminal justice system.

She rode the three UK stages of the Tour de France in a Tour de Force group, raising money for the William Wates Memorial Trust for disadvantaged young people. She won the 2014 Running Awards Runners' Challenge.

Webster is working in the global fight to eradicate malaria. She travelled to Uganda and spent time in a high endemic malaria community making a film in conjunction with the Commonwealth Malaria campaign Malaria Must Die. She launched a Mass Action Against Malaria initiative with President Museveni delivering the keynote speech in the Uganda Parliament in Kampala.

Illness 
In August 2016, Webster contracted malaria and became seriously ill after completing a six-week, 3,000-mile bicycle ride from the London Olympic Stadium to Rio de Janeiro, where the 2016 Summer Olympics were being held. She was given 24 hours to live and put on a life support machine. Her ride was in memory of Jane Tomlinson and aimed to raise funds for the Jane Tomlinson Appeal. For a period of time she was in an induced coma and required dialysis.

References

External links

Empowering Women Awards launch party Marie Claire, 2 March 2010

1982 births
Living people
Alumni of Newcastle University
BBC television presenters
British sports broadcasters
English female models
English television presenters
Motorsport announcers
Sportspeople from Sheffield
Television personalities from South Yorkshire